"Viva la Vida" is a 2008 song by Coldplay.

Viva la Vida may also refer to:

Films
 ¡Viva la vida!, a 1934 film directed by José María Castellví
 Viva la vie, a 1984 French film directed by Claude Lelouch

Music

Albums
 Viva la Vida or Death and All His Friends, 2008 Coldplay album
 Viva la Vida, 1991 album by Joan Sebastian
 Viva la Vida, 2012 album by Vikki Carr
 Vivalavida, 1999 album by Carnival in Coal

Songs
 "Viva la Vida", 1941 song from Billy the Kid (1941 film)
 "Viva la Vida", 1986 song by Michel Fugain
 "Viva la Vida", 2004 song by Roy Brown (Puerto Rican musician) on Balcon del Fin del Mundo
 "Viva la Vida", 2011 song by In Extremo from the album Sterneneisen
 "Viva la Vida", 2012 song by Vikki Carr
 "Viva La Vida", 2022 song by Hong Jin-young
 "¡Que Viva La Vida!", 2011 song by Wisin & Yandel

Tours 
 Viva la Vida Tour by Coldplay

Paintings
 "Viva la Vida, Sandías" (1954), a painting by Frida Kahlo